Alphitonia is a genus of arborescent flowering plants comprising about 20 species, constituting part of the buckthorn family (Rhamnaceae). They occur in tropical regions of Southeast Asia, Oceania and Polynesia. These are large trees or shrubs. In Australia, they are often called "ash trees" or "sarsaparilla trees". This is rather misleading however; among the flowering plants, Alphitonia is not closely related to the true ash trees (Fraxinus of the asterids), and barely at all to the monocot sarsaparilla vines (Smilax).

The name is derived from Greek álphiton ("barley-meal"), from the mealy quality of their fruits' mesocarps. Another interpretation is that "baked barley meal" alludes to the mealy red covering around the hard cells in the fruit.

The lanceolate coriaceous leaves are alternate, about 12 cm long. The margins are smooth. Venation is pinnate. They have white to rusty complex hairs on the under surface. The petiole is less than a quarter the length of a blade. Stipules are present.

The small flowers form terminal or axillary clusters of small creamy blossoms during spring. The flowers are bisexual. Hypanthium is present. The flowers show 5 sepals, 5 petals and 5 stamens. The ovary is inferior. The fruits are ovoid, blackish non-fleshy capsules, with one seed per locule.

Alphitonia species are used as food plants by the larva the hepialid moth Aenetus mirabilis, which feed only on these trees. They burrow horizontally into the trunk, then vertically down.

Selected species 
 Alphitonia carolinensis 
 Alphitonia excelsa (Fenzl) Reissek ex Benth. – soap tree, red ash (Australia)
 Alphitonia ferruginea 
 Alphitonia franguloides 
 Alphitonia incana 
 Alphitonia macrocarpa 
 Alphitonia marquesensis F.Brown – makee (Marquesas Islands)
 Alphitonia moluccana 
 Alphitonia neocaledonica  New Caledonia
 Alphitonia obtusifolia 
 Alphitonia petriei  – pink ash, white ash (Australia)
 Alphitonia ponderosa Hillebr. – kauila (Hawaii)
 Alphitonia philippinensis 
 Alphitonia rubiginota 
 Alphitonia whitei  – red ash (Australia)
 Alphitonia zizyphoides (Solander) A.Gray – toi (Polynesia)

References

External links

 
Rhamnaceae genera